San Diego is an administrative neighborhood (barrio) of Madrid belonging to the district of Puente de Vallecas.

Description 
San Diego is one of the six administrative neighborhoods comprising the district of Puente de Vallecas. It has a surface of 106.99 ha. It has a sizeable immigrant population; in 2010 34.91% of residents were immigrants. The population in 2016 was  inhabitants.

References

Bibliography 
 
 

Wards of Madrid
Puente de Vallecas